Saree Makdisi (born 1964) is an American literary critic and professor; specializing in eighteenth and nineteenth century British literature. He is of Palestinian and Lebanese descent. He also writes on contemporary Arab politics and culture. Makdisi currently holds the title of Professor of English and Comparative Literature at the University of California, Los Angeles (UCLA).

Background
Makdisi was born in the United States (Washington). His father, Samir Makdisi, is a Lebanese-Palestinian professor of Economics at  the American University of Beirut and his mother, Jean Said Makdisi, is a Palestinian independent scholar (formerly of Beirut University College). He is also the grandson of Anis K. Makdisi, a professor of Arabic at American University of Beirut  and the nephew of the late literary scholar, Edward Said. In 2009, Makdisi gave the Edward Said Memorial lecture at Adelaide University.

He spent his early childhood in the United States, moving to Lebanon at the age of eight. While he grew up in a Christian family, they lived in a "largely Muslim neighborhood in Beirut." Makdisi returned to the United States for his final year in high school and also attended college there. He received his B.A. from Wesleyan University in 1987, Ph.D. from Duke University in 1993, and taught for a decade as an Assistant Professor, then as an Associate Professor, of English and Comparative Literature at the University of Chicago before joining UCLA in 2003.

Selected publications

Books
 Romantic Imperialism: Universal Empire and the Culture of Modernity (New York and Cambridge, Eng.: Cambridge University Press, 1998)
 William Blake and the Impossible History of the 1790s (Chicago: University of Chicago Press, 2003)
 Palestine Inside Out: An Everyday Occupation (WW Norton, 2008; revised and updated, with a new foreword by Alice Walker, 2010)
Making England Western: Occidentalism, Race & Imperial Culture (London and Chicago, University of Chicago Press, 2014)

Articles and interviews
"Domesticating Exoticism: Transformations of Britain's Orient, 1785-1835" from Romantic Imperialism (Cambridge University Press, 1998).
January 2009 radio interview about Palestine Inside Out: An Everyday Occupation on KPFA.

Awards
2009 Arab American Book Award, Honorable Mention:Palestine Inside Out: An Everyday Occupation

Notes

External links

Official website
Official blog
UCLA faculty profile

American people of Palestinian descent
American writers of Lebanese descent
Duke University alumni
Literary critics of English
Living people
Wesleyan University alumni
Writers on the Middle East
University of California, Los Angeles faculty
University of Chicago faculty
1964 births
Said family